Manfull Ridge is a broad snow-covered ridge that descends gently from the north side of the Kohler Range about  west of Morrison Bluff, in Marie Byrd Land, Antarctica. It was mapped by the United States Geological Survey from ground surveys and U.S. Navy air photos, 1959–71, and was named by the Advisory Committee on Antarctic Names for Byron P. Manfull of the U.S. Department of State, Chairman of the Interagency Committee on Antarctica, 1967–69.

References

Ridges of Marie Byrd Land